"Enjoy the Silence" is a song by English electronic music band Depeche Mode. Recorded in 1989, it was released as the second single from their seventh studio album, Violator (1990), on 5 February 1990. The single is certified Gold in the US and Germany. The song won Best British Single at the 1991 Brit Awards.

"Enjoy the Silence" was re-released as a single in 2004 for the Depeche Mode remix project Remixes 81–04, and was titled "Enjoy the Silence (Reinterpreted)" or, more simply, "Enjoy the Silence 04".

Background
Songwriter Martin Gore created a ballad-like first version of the song, which the band took into the studio in 1989. At band member Alan Wilder's insistence, the song was re-worked into the up-tempo version released on the album.

Release
"Enjoy the Silence" was released as a single on 5 February 1990. It was initially released as a 7-inch and 12-inch vinyl single as well as a cassette and CD single. There are two instrumental B-sides to "Enjoy the Silence". "Sibeling" (the 12-inch B-side) is a soft piano-tune while "Memphisto" (the 7" B-side) is a darker, eerier track. The title of "Sibeling" refers to Finnish classical composer Jean Sibelius. According to Martin Gore, "Memphisto is the name of an imaginary film about Elvis as a Devil, that I created in my mind", and is a portmanteau of "Memphis" (where Elvis lived at Graceland) and "Mephisto". "Enjoy the Silence" was Depeche Mode's highest charting single in the United States, peaking at number eight on the Billboard Hot 100 in July 1990.

Critical reception
In an retrospective review, Andy Healy from Albumism wrote that the song "combined much loved elements of lush synth beds, haunting melodies, and aching lyrics, which coalesced with house beats and slick guitar lines." He added, "Gahan's vocals are intimate and seductive as they draw you in, with lyrics that examine the quiet satisfaction of a relationship, those tender moments when silence fills the void and your lover is in your arms and the world ceases to exist. There was something inviting. Something powerful in those declarations. Something that you could latch on to and feel a part of." AllMusic editor Tim Di Gravina stated that it is one of Depeche Mode's "greatest songs", with a "pristine and lush yet punishing musical environment", and "lyrics of violence and darkness". Upon the release, Bill Coleman from Billboard called it an "engaging charmer" and a "more radio-viable effort" than the group's last hit, "Personal Jesus". He noted further that the track "blends [the] quintet's recognizable techno-pop melodies with trendy house grooves." 

Simon Reynolds from Melody Maker wrote, "Depeche studiously keep their finger on the pulse of contemporaneity (the choral synths nod to the New Age thang, the guitars to New Order), but somehow the glum, earnest vibrato in the singer's gullet make this feel very dated: New Romanticism infected with C86 miserablism." David Giles from Music Week commented, "The best Depeche Mode single in years heralds a return to the classic pop approach of their early Eighties hits like Everything Counts in contrast to the electro beat obsession of recent recordings. The song itself is heavily to the fore here, and strong enough, perhaps to furnish the band with their first number one hit." A reviewer from People Magazine said the song is "enriched", "with a strong bass and percussive bottom overwhelming the band’s penchant for thin, ethereal synthesizer motifs." Stephen Gore from Sputnik Music noted the juxtaposition on Violator between "Enjoy the Silence" – where the narrator wants silence from the world as words are "like violence" – and the next song "Policy of Truth", which argues that a successful relationship can only be based on lies.

Music videos

Original versions
The Anton Corbijn-directed music video for "Enjoy the Silence" references the themes and storyline of the philosophical children's book The Little Prince from Antoine de Saint-Exupéry. Footage of Dave Gahan dressed as a stereotypical king wandering the hillsides of the Scottish Highlands, the coast of the Algarve in Portugal and finally the Swiss Alps with a deck chair is intercut with black-and-white footage of the band posing. Brief flashes of a single rose (which is also on the album cover of Violator) appear throughout the scenes.

When Corbijn presented the concept of the video to the band, which at the time was simply "Dave dressed up as a king, walking around with a deck chair", they initially rejected it. They changed their minds, when he explained that the idea was that the King (Dave) represented "a man with everything in the world, just looking for a quiet place to sit"; a king of no kingdom. Andy Fletcher joked that he favoured the video because "[he] only had to do about an hour's worth of work".

The video uses a slightly different mix of the album version of the song (the most notable difference being a new and extended introduction) that has not been released in any audio format. The final long shots of the king walking through the snow are not Gahan but rather the video's producer, Richard Bell. Gahan had left the set, tired of the cold in Switzerland (recounted by Gahan in the intro to The Videos (86-98) and to the DVD of The Best of Depeche Mode Volume 1).

There are two edited versions of the Corbijn-directed video. One version begins with Andy Fletcher looking towards his right as the song begins. Shots of Dave Gahan dressed as a king singing directly to the camera are intercut with scenes of his walking through the Scottish Highlands, the coast of Portugal and the Swiss Alps. The video ends with Gahan singing the last line, "Enjoy the silence", then putting his finger in front of his lips as if to quiet the viewer. 
The second version begins with Martin Gore looking to his right as the song begins. This version omits the shots of Gahan singing directly to the camera. In this version, the only lines Gahan is shown singing are "Words are very unnecessary/They can only do harm." The video ends with Gahan sitting on a deck chair in the snow while the last line, "Enjoy the silence", is sung. There are also differences in the group shots of the band standing together between the two versions.

Promotional video
On 2 December 1989, "Enjoy the Silence" was performed live on Peter's Pop Show in Germany. On 19 December 1989, a promotional single for "Enjoy the Silence" was pressed. In 1990, a promotional video for "Enjoy the Silence" was shot by French TV (for the TV Show "Champs-Élysées" with Michel Drucker) featuring Depeche Mode lip-synching the song while standing on the observation deck atop the South Tower of the original World Trade Center.

Impact and legacy
Pitchfork Media ranked "Enjoy the Silence" number 15 in their list of Top 200 Tracks of the 90s. Rolling Stone included it in their list of 500 Best Songs of All Time in 2021 at No. 415.

Track listings

7-inch and cassette: Mute / Bong18, CBong18 (UK)
 "Enjoy the Silence" – 4:15
 "Memphisto" – 4:02

12-inch: Mute / 12Bong18 (UK)
 "Enjoy the Silence (7-inch Version)" – 4:15
 "Enjoy the Silence (Hands and Feet Mix/12-inch Version)" – 7:18
 "Enjoy the Silence (Ecstatic Dub)" – 5:54
 "Sibeling" – 3:14

12-inch: Mute / L12Bong18 (UK)
 "Enjoy the Silence (Bass Line)" – 7:40
 "Enjoy the Silence (Harmonium)" – 2:41
 "Enjoy the Silence (Ricki Tik Tik Mix)" – 5:27
 "Memphisto" – 4:05

12-inch: Mute / XL12Bong18 (UK)
 "Enjoy the Silence (The Quad: Final Mix)" – 15:30

CD: Mute / CDBong18 (UK)
 "Enjoy the Silence" – 4:16
 "Enjoy the Silence (Hands and Feet Mix 3-inch Edit)" – 6:41
 "Enjoy the Silence (Ecstatic Dub Edit)" – 5:45
 "Sibeling" – 3:15
 released as 3-inch CD, rereleased as 5-inch CD

CD: Mute / LCDBong18 (UK)
 "Enjoy the Silence (Bass Line)" – 7:40
 "Enjoy the Silence (Harmonium)" – 2:41
 "Enjoy the Silence (Ricki Tik Tik Mix)" – 5:27
 "Memphisto" – 4:05
 released as 3-inch CD

CD: Mute / XLCDBong18 (UK)
 "Enjoy the Silence (The Quad: Final Mix)" – 15:27

CD: Mute / CDBong18X (EU)
 "Enjoy the Silence" – 4:15
 "Memphisto" – 4:02
 "Enjoy the Silence (Hands and Feet Mix 3-inch Edit)" – 6:41
 "Enjoy the Silence (Ecstatic Dub Edit)" – 5:45
 "Sibeling" – 3:15
 "Enjoy the Silence (Bass Line)" – 7:42
 "Enjoy the Silence (Harmonium)" – 2:41
 "Enjoy the Silence (Ricki Tik Tik Mix [Promo Version])" – 5:59
 "Enjoy the Silence (The Quad: Final Mix)" – 15:30
 This CD is the 2004 box set re-release

12-inch and cassette: Sire/Reprise / 0-21490 / 4-21490 (US)
 "Enjoy the Silence (The Quad: Final Mix)" – 15:27
 "Enjoy the Silence (Ecstatic Dub)" – 5:54
 "Enjoy the Silence (Bass Line)" – 7:40
 "Enjoy the Silence (Hands and Feet Mix)" – 7:20
 "Memphisto" – 4:05

CD: Sire/Reprise / 21490-2 (US)
 "Enjoy the Silence" – 4:15
 "Enjoy the Silence (Hands and Feet Mix)" – 7:18
 "Sibeling" – 3:15
 "Enjoy the Silence (Bass Line)" – 7:40
 "Enjoy the Silence (Ecstatic Dub)" – 5:54
 "Memphisto" – 4:02
 "Enjoy the Silence (Ricki Tik Tik Mix)" – 5:27
 "Enjoy the Silence (Harmonium)" – 2:41

Charts

Weekly charts

Year-end charts

Sales and certifications

"Enjoy the Silence 04"

"Enjoy the Silence" was re-released as a single on 18 October 2004 for the remix project Remixes 81–04 and was entitled "Enjoy the Silence (Reinterpreted)", or "Enjoy the Silence 04". The "Reinterpreted" version was remixed by Mike Shinoda, the rapper and producer for the American band Linkin Park, who played most of the instruments.

Track listings

CD: Mute / CDBong34 (EU)
 "Enjoy the Silence (Reinterpreted)" – 3:32
 "Halo (Goldfrapp Remix)" – 4:22

CD: Mute / LCDBong34 (EU)
 "Enjoy the Silence (Timo Maas Extended Remix)" – 8:41
 "Enjoy the Silence (Ewan Pearson Remix [Radio Edit])" – 3:33
 "Something to Do (Black Strobe Remix)" – 7:11

CD: Mute / XLCDBong34 (EU)
 "Enjoy the Silence (Richard X Extended Mix)" – 8:22
 "Enjoy the Silence (Ewan Pearson Extended Remix)" – 8:39
 "World in My Eyes (Cicada Remix)" – 6:18
 "Mercy in You (The BRAT Mix)" – 7:03

12-inch: Mute / 12Bong34 (EU)
 "Enjoy the Silence (Timo Maas Extended Remix)" – 8:41
 "Enjoy the Silence (Ewan Pearson Extended Remix)" – 8:39

12-inch: Mute / L12Bong34 (EU)
 "Something to Do (Black Strobe Remix)" – 7:11
 "World in My Eyes (Cicada Remix)" – 6:18
 "Photographic (Rex the Dog Dubb Mix)" – 6:20

12-inch: Mute / XL12Bong34 (EU)
 "Halo (Goldfrapp Remix)" – 4:22
 "Clean (Colder Version)" – 7:09
 "Little 15 (Ulrich Schnauss Remix)" – 4:52

12-inch: Reprise / 42757-0 (US)
 "Enjoy the Silence (Timo Maas Extended Remix)" – 8:41
 "Enjoy the Silence (Ewan Pearson Extended Remix)" – 8:39
 "Enjoy the Silence (Richard X Extended Mix)" – 8:22
 "World in My Eyes (Cicada Remix)" – 6:18

CD: Reprise / 42757-2 (US)
 "Enjoy the Silence (Reinterpreted)" – 3:32
 "Enjoy the Silence (Timo Maas Extended Remix)" – 8:41
 "Enjoy the Silence (Ewan Pearson Extended Remix)" – 8:39
 "Enjoy the Silence (Richard X Extended Mix)" – 8:22
 "World in My Eyes (Cicada Remix)" – 6:18
 "Something to Do (Black Strobe Remix)" – 7:11

Personnel
 Dave Gahan - lead vocals
 Mike Shinoda - piano, guitars, keyboards, bass, drums, synthesizers
 Martin Gore - guitars, backing vocals
 Rob Bourdon - drums

Music video
Mike Shinoda's "Enjoy the Silence 04" was a distortion guitar-driven version of the song, in which he imprinted Linkin Park's distinctive nu metal sound. Its animated music video was directed by Uwe Flade. Monitors in the animation show performances of "Enjoy the Silence" excerpted from Devotional and One Night in Paris, as well as footage from a concert from The Singles Tour filmed in Cologne in 1998 for MTV.

Charts

Weekly charts

Year-end charts

Notable cover versions

Tori Amos version
Tori Amos covered the song for her 2001 concept album Strange Little Girls. Stereogum listed Tori's version as one of the 8 most memorable Depeche Mode covers.

Lacuna Coil version

"Enjoy the Silence" is the second single by Lacuna Coil from their album Karmacode. It made the New York Posts Top 100 Cover Songs list.

Music video
There is a UK version of the video and an international one. Both videos, shot with "Closer" music video on 12 March 2006, came out in June 2006, include the band performing in a dark room, but aside from that the UK version shows live clips of the London Forum show, while the international one shows scenes of a city (Portland, Oregon), the countryside, and a bay.

Track listings
There are three "volumes" of the single.

Volume I
 "Enjoy the Silence" – 4:08
 "The Edge" (live) – 3:28
 "Fragile" (live) – 4:40
 "Video Interview" (enhanced video)

Volume II
 "Enjoy the Silence"
 "To the Edge" (live)
 "Fragile" (live)
 "Tight Rope" (live)

Volume III (picture disc)
 "Enjoy the Silence"
 "Silence"

Digital single
 "Enjoy the Silence" – 4:06
 "Virtual Environment" – 5:23
 "To the Edge" (live) – 3:28
 "Fragile" (live) – 4:40
 "Tight Rope" (live) – 4:54
 "Enjoy the Silence" (live) – 4:22

Charts

Other cover versions
The only other version to be a hit single in the UK was by Mike Koglin. Slightly re-titled as "The Silence", it reached number 20 in 1998.
Besides this, a cover by Breaking Benjamin was featured in their compilation album Shallow Bay: The Best of Breaking Benjamin.

See also
List of European number-one airplay songs of the 1990s

References

External links
 Single information from the official Depeche Mode web site
 Allmusic review 
 Enjoy the Silence arranged by Eric Whitacre for SATB
 Single information from the official Depeche Mode web site

1989 songs
1990 singles
Brit Award for British Single
Depeche Mode songs
Songs written by Martin Gore
Song recordings produced by Flood (producer)
Music videos directed by Anton Corbijn
Mute Records singles
Century Media Records singles
Number-one singles in Spain
Number-one singles in Denmark
2004 singles
Songs written by Mike Shinoda
2006 singles
Lacuna Coil songs
UK Independent Singles Chart number-one singles